Clara is a monotypic moth genus of the family Erebidae. Its only species, Clara monsalvei, is found in Chile. Both the genus and the species were first described by Victor Hugo Ruiz-Rodriguez in 1989.

Other sources give this name as either a species group of Hadena Schrank, 1802 or a subgenus of Jochroa Felder, 1874.

References

External links
Original description: 

Calpinae
Monotypic moth genera
Endemic fauna of Chile